The Western Islands are a group of islands in the Bismarck Archipelago, and within Manus Province of the Islands Region, in northern Papua New Guinea.

Geography
They are located north and west of Manus Island off the northeastern coast of New Guinea island in the Bismarck Sea of the Southwestern Pacific Ocean.

The Western Islands' tropical rainforests include several distinct ecoregions.

Islands
Islands in the group include:
 Aua Island 
 Hermit Islands 
 Kaniet Islands (Anchorite Islands)
 Sae Island
 Ninigo Islands 
 Wuvulu Island

See also

External links
Geographical Names in the Western Islands
Wuvulu.com: The Western Islands

Archipelagoes of Papua New Guinea
Bismarck Archipelago
Manus Province
Geography of Melanesia